DCAT may refer to:

Data Catalog Vocabulary
Transportation in Texas Drive Clean Across Texas